Tati is an album by Italian jazz trumpeter and composer Enrico Rava recorded in 2004 and released on the ECM label.

Reception
The Allmusic review by Michael G. Nastos awarded the album 3½ stars stating "On what is certainly a late-night offering for most listeners, Rava and friends have provided a beautiful organic dream of a recording, appropriate for various dining, resting, or romantic activities when the sun goes down and the breeze is nil".
In 2011, Ricardo Villalobos and Max Loderbauer used samples of Tati as the basis for the track "Rebird" on the remix album Re:ECM.

Track listing
All compositions by Enrico Rava except as indicated
 "The Man I Love" (George Gershwin) - 6:01 
 "Birdsong" (Paul Motian) - 2:19 
 "Tati" - 4:40 
 "Casa di Bambola" (Stefano Bollani) - 3:45 
 "E Lucevan le Stelle" (Giacomo Puccini) - 5:40 
 "Mirrors" - 5:56 
 "Jessica Too" - 3:57 
 "Golden Eyes" - 4:26 
 "Fantasm" (Motian) - 4:06 
 "Cornettology" - 6:36 
 "Overboard" - 3:09 
 "Gang of 5" (Motian) - 4:07
Recorded at Avatar Studios in New York in November 2004

Personnel
Enrico Rava - trumpet
Stefano Bollani - piano
Paul Motian - drums

References

ECM Records albums
Enrico Rava albums
2005 albums
Albums produced by Manfred Eicher